Rodney Bell (born 6 November 1936) is a Brazilian water polo player. He competed in the men's tournament at the 1964 Summer Olympics.

References

1936 births
Living people
Brazilian male water polo players
Olympic water polo players of Brazil
Water polo players at the 1964 Summer Olympics
Water polo players from São Paulo